Wang Xindi (born 2 May 1995) is a Chinese freestyle skier. He competed in the 2018 Winter Olympics and the 2022 Winter Olympics.

References

External links

1995 births
Living people
Freestyle skiers at the 2018 Winter Olympics
Freestyle skiers at the 2022 Winter Olympics
Chinese male freestyle skiers
Olympic freestyle skiers of China
People from Qinhuangdao
Skiers from Hebei